Libuše Nováková (born 29 March 1924) was a Czech athlete. She competed in the women's discus throw at the 1952 Summer Olympics.

References

External links
 

1924 births
Possibly living people
Athletes (track and field) at the 1952 Summer Olympics
Czech female discus throwers
Olympic athletes of Czechoslovakia
Place of birth missing